Margot Desvignes (born 10 June 2000) is a French ice hockey forward for Göteborg HC in the SDHL and the French national team.

Career 
Before beginning to play ice hockey at the age of 13, Desvignes was a speed skater. In 2018, she left France to sign with HC Université Neuchâtel in the SWHL A.

After two years in Switzerland, Desvignes signed with Göteborg in Sweden.

International 
She represented France at the 2019 IIHF Women's World Championship.

Career statistics

References

External links

2000 births
Living people
French expatriate ice hockey people
French expatriate sportspeople in Switzerland
French women's ice hockey forwards
Göteborg HC players